Grayer is a surname. Notable people with the surname include:

 Jeff Grayer (born 1965), American basketball player
 Jonathan Grayer (born 1964), American businessperson

See also
 Drayer
 Graver (surname)